Mahamat Ali Adoum (born 14 November 1947) is a Chadian politician and diplomat who served in the government Ambassador to Canada since 2014.

Life and career
Adoum was Chad's Ambassador to the United States, Canada and Argentina from 1983 to 1992. He was appointed as Minister of Foreign Affairs on May 22, 1992, serving until July 1993. During this time, he was a co-agent representing the Chadian government at the International Court of Justice in 1993 regarding his country's territorial dispute with Libya. In April 1994, Adoum joined the World Bank as Senior Advisor to the Executive Director for African French-speaking countries, and he remained at the World Bank until 2003. He was later appointed as Permanent Representative of Chad to the United Nations, presenting his credentials to the UN Secretary-General on February 15, 2005. He served until 2013 when he was replaced by Cherif Mahamat Zene.

He has also represented Chad in Belgium, Netherlands, Luxembourg, United Kingdom and the European Community.

In May 2014, Adoum was appointed as Ambassador to Canada.

Education 
Adoum received a diploma in education from Université de Brazzaville, a bachelor's degree in political science from Université Laval in Quebec City, and his master's degree from the School of Advanced International Studies at Johns Hopkins University in Baltimore, Maryland.

References

1947 births
Living people
Paul H. Nitze School of Advanced International Studies alumni
Université Laval alumni
Chadian diplomats
Permanent Representatives of Chad to the United Nations
Government ministers of Chad
Ambassadors of Chad to the United States
Ambassadors of Chad to Canada
Ambassadors of Chad to Argentina
Marien Ngouabi University alumni
Chadian officials of the United Nations
Foreign ministers of Chad